Robert Aleksandrovich Shtilmark (April 3, 1909, Moscow – September 30, 1985) was a Soviet writer and journalist. He was known as the author of the adventure novel The Heir From Calcutta.

Biography
Born in Moscow in the family of engineer Alexander Shtilmark. In 1929, he graduated from the Higher Literary and Art Institute Named After Valery Bryusov. In the same year, he married Evgenia Belago. Evgenia was an expert on Japanese economics, and in the early 1920s, she worked in Japan with her first husband, a diplomat. Soon they had a son, Felix, a future ecologist and biologist.

Shtilmark worked as an assistant and head of the department of the Scandinavian countries in the All–Union Society of Cultural Relations with Abroad. Subsequently, he was an international journalist in the newspaper Izvestia, in the Telegraph Agency of the Soviet Union, worked as an editor in the magazines "Foreign Literature", "Young Guard".

He published a collection of his poems and a book of essays "Draining the Sea" (1932). Since 1937, he was a researcher and teacher of the Department of Foreign Languages of the Valerian Kuibyshev Military Academy.

During the war
During the Great Patriotic War, he was the assistant commander of a reconnaissance company. He was wounded in the battles near Leningrad. In 1942, after a serious injury and concussion, he was sent as a teacher to the Tashkent Infantry School, then transferred to Moscow, taught at the Higher Command Courses of the Workers' and Peasants' Red Army. In 1943, he graduated from the Leningrad Red Banner Military Topographic School, was a senior teacher of military topography. With the rank of captain, he served in the Military Topographic Directorate of the General Staff.

For military services he received awards:
Order of the Patriotic War, 1st Class;
Order of the Red Star;
Medal "For Courage";
Medal "For the Defence of Leningrad".

In 1944, his wife died.

Arrest and imprisonment
In April 1945, Shtilmark was arrested on charges of "counter–revolutionary agitation" and sentenced to 10 years in prison.

Was sent to the Yenisei Correctional Labour Camp; here he worked as a topographer, then – head of the literary part of the camp theater. Shtilmark sat in the 33rd, 25th and 10th columns near Janov Stan. Released in 1953, he first settled in Yeniseisk. Fully rehabilitated in 1955, then he lived in Moscow.

Heir From Calcutta
Shtilmark is the author of the adventure novel The Heir From Calcutta, written in a conclusion commissioned by the crime boss Vasily Vasilevsky. The latter hoped to send Stalin a novel under his own name and receive an amnesty for it.

Work on the creation of the novel took a year and two months; it was completed on July 15, 1951. While Shtilmark was writing the novel, Vasilevsky needed him. When the novel was finished, Vasilevsky decided to eliminate Shtilmark in order to appropriate the authorship. Vasilevsky turned to professional killers. By a lucky coincidence, the murder did not take place: the bed on which Shtilmark was supposed to lie was torn apart at night, torn to pieces, the blanket was punctured in several places, and the pillow was cut with an ax. A second attempt on his life did not take place, since at that moment the fate of the writer brought Shtilmark to the criminal, and in the future by the famous writer Mikhail Demin, who, using his authority among the thieves, warned Vasilevsky not to touch Shtilmark again. Demin described the details of the failed murder in his autobiographical novel Thug.

Vasilevsky signed the text with two surnames – his own and Shtilmark, and sent the novel to Moscow, the writer's son. In Moscow, the manuscript was lost, and only after a long search did Shtilmark manage to find it.

The novel has received rave reviews from several well–known writers, including Ivan Efremov. It was first published in 1958 by the Children's State Publishing House (in the Library of Adventures and Science Fiction series) and immediately went through several reprints (in Irkutsk, Alma–Ata).

In 1959, Vasilevsky, also released under an amnesty, tried to sue himself half of the fees, but it turned out that Shtilmark had prudently embedded a cipher text into one of the chapters of the novel, proving his authorship.

A new wave of interest in the novel came during 1989 to 1993.

Last years
From 1970 to 1981, Shtilmark worked on his autobiographical chronicle A Handful of Light, part of which was first published in his four–volume collected works in 2001. Shtilmark, despite the lack of money and great ability to work, treated everything that came out of his pen with high exactingness, as a result of which most of his plans were not completed and remained either in drafts or in the memory of the audience (Shtilmark was recognized as an excellent storyteller): novels "The Gem of Feroniera", "Koptevskiy Gentleman", stories about the artists Pavel Korin and Mikhail Nesterov. Stories "The Feat of Love" (about Vladimir Dal) and "The Winged Prisoner" (another name: "The Fighter Seeks Battle"; about the honored pilot Vyacheslav Valentey who escaped from Nazi captivity), as well as an extensive epistolary legacy remained unpublished.

In the late 1970s, Shtilmark married Alexandra Shtilmark, née Zernova. In this marriage, a daughter, Maria Shtilmark, and a son, Alexander Shtilmark, were born.

Robert Shtilmark died on September 30, 1985. He was buried at the Vvedenskoye Cemetery (section 14).

Bibliography

Robert Shtilmark. Heir From Calcutta – Moscow: Children's State Publishing House, 1958 – 840 Pages
Robert Shtilmark. The Story of the Russian Wanderer (Vasily Baranshchikov) – Moscow: State Publishing House of Geographical Literature, 1962 – 240 Pages

Robert Shtilmark. Passenger on the Last Flight – Moscow: Young Guard, 1974
Robert Shtilmark. The Ringing Bell of Russia: Herzen. Pages of Life – Moscow, 1976
Robert Shtilmark. Beyond the Moscow River: Alexander Ostrovsky. Pages of Life – Moscow, 1983

References

Sources
Robert Shtilmark. "And Here I Am Sitting in the Turukhansk Territory" in the Magazine "Polar Horizons", No. 3, 1990
 Biography of the Author and His Main Book.

External links
Yuri Druzhnikov. Heir From Turukhansk. From the Stories That Pop Up In our Kitchen // "Russian America", No. 323, 2005
M. Korol. The Story of One Book // Science And Life, 1998, No. 10
About Shtilmarks and the Heir from Calcutta
Shtilmark's Works
Alexander Scheidt. People and Events // "In Time", April 21, 2000, No. 15 (159)
501st Construction Site. Dead Road...
Shtilmark, Robert Alexandrovich on the site "Laboratory of Fantasy"

1909 births
1985 deaths
Soviet writers
World War II spies for the Soviet Union
Burials at Vvedenskoye Cemetery